Lycée Français de Málaga is a French international school in Málaga, Spain. It serves levels petite section through terminale, the final year of lycée (senior high school/sixth form college). It occupies a former sports club.

History
The Ecole Française de Málaga (Escuela Francesa de Málaga) was formed on 15 September 1968 by the merger of three smaller schools: a French school in Torremolinos opened by three French teachers in 1966, another French school in Torremolinos opened in 1967, and a French school in Málaga opened in 1967. The French consul general in Malaga had asked the schools to merge.

The school initially occupied the "Villa Rosa" building on Paseo de Reding. It received 120 students in its first year even though it had expected to get 80 students. It moved to a Paseo de Sancha facility in 1972. It received its second facility in 1981. By June 1986 the name changed to the current one as its sixth form programme had opened. It moved to its current campus that month.

See also
 Liceo Español Luis Buñuel, a Spanish international school near Paris, France

References

External links
 Lycée Français de Málaga 
 Lycée Français de Málaga 
 APE du Lycée Français de Malaga "Emilie Du Châtelet" (APELFM) 

French international schools in Spain
1968 establishments in Spain
Educational institutions established in 1968
Málaga